|}

This is a list of House of Assembly results for the 1944 South Australian state election.

Results by electoral district

Adelaide

Albert 

 Preferences were not distributed.

Alexandra

Angas 

 Preferences were not distributed.

Burnside

Burra

Chaffey

Eyre

Flinders

Frome

Gawler

Glenelg

Goodwood

Gouger

Gumeracha

Hindmarsh

Light

Mitcham

Mount Gambier

Murray

Newcastle

Norwood

Onkaparinga

Port Adelaide

Port Pirie

Prospect

Ridley

Rocky River

Semaphore

Stanley

Stirling 

 Sitting MP for Stirling, Herbert Dunn had been elected as an Independent in the previous election, but joined the LCL before this election.

Stuart

Thebarton

Torrens

Unley

Victoria

Wallaroo

Yorke Peninsula

Young

See also
 Candidates of the 1944 South Australian state election
 Members of the South Australian House of Assembly, 1944–1947

References

1944
1944 elections in Australia
1940s in South Australia